The province of Attica was one of the provinces of Attica, Greece. It consisted of parts of the East Attica and West Attica prefectures. Its territory corresponded with that of the current municipalities Acharnes, Dionysos, Kropia, Lavreotiki, Marathon, Markopoulo Mesogaias, Oropos, Paiania, Pallini (except the municipal unit Gerakas), Rafina-Pikermi, Saronikos, Spata-Artemida and Fyli. It was abolished in 2006.

References

Provinces of Greece
Attica
2006 disestablishments in Greece